Rockgol was a television show from MTV Brasil, a football championship disputed by musicians. The show ran from 1995 to 2008, and later from 2011 to 2013, until the end of MTV Brasil. The matches were most famously "narrated" by comedians  Paulo Bonfá and Marco Bianchi, with sarcastic and sometime off-game comments, and putting nicknames on most musicians.

The championship 
From 1995 to 2000, the tournament was disputed in single-elimination. After 2001, it followed the FIFA World Cup formula of 3 groups (named M, T and V after the network) followed by single-elimination semifinals\finals. The only exception was 2006, with only two groups.

The games occurred in São Paulo Athletic Club, São Paulo, except for 2000, when it happened in Rio de Janeiro. But the hosts say that the games happen in the small town of Birigui, SP, in the "Birigui Sports Arena" as a running joke.

Until 2002, the teams were chosen by the musicians themselves, but in that year the bands were sorted into teams. The names were also free to choose, before the ready names from 2003 on (in 2003, random names: the finals were Papas Fritas - french fries x Gafanhotos - locusts; in 2004, animal names: Aranhas Negras - black spiders- vs. Tamanduás - anteaters - finals; in 2005, diseases: Resfriados - colds- vs. Diabéticos -diabetics-; in 2006, fictional nations: Luxemburgo x Pirulândia; and in 2007, parodies of real clubs: Horríver Prata - River Plate - x Milanesa - A.C. Milan.

The biggest defeat was 0x17 in 1999, suffered by a team formed by Jota Quest, Sideral and Tianastácia.

The biggest Rockgol winner is three-times champion Fredi Endres, guitarist of Comunidade Nin-Jitsu, nicknamed by the hosts "Chernobyl" because of his bizarre haircut.

Only two persons participated in all tournaments: Ultraje a Rigor frontman Roger Moreira and Ratos de Porão guitarist Jão.

The events

Rockgol 1995 
 Winner: Skank
 Runner-up: Barão Vermelho
 Venue: São Paulo Athletic Club

Rockgol 1996 
 Winner: Sr. Banana
 Runner-up: Raimundos
 Third: Skank
 Venue: São Paulo Athletic Club

Rockgol 1997 
 Winner: Cidade Negra, Gabriel o Pensador, Toni Platão
 Second: Barão Vermelho, Blitz
 Third: Sr. Banana, Resist Control
 Fourth: Ultraje a Rigor, Dr. Sin
 Venue: São Paulo Athletic Club

Rockgol 1998 
 Winner: O Rappa, Devotos Do Ódio
 Second: Dado e o Reino Animal, Cidade Negra
 Third: Claudinho e Buchecha, Os Morenos
 Fourth: Skank, Ivo Meirelles & Funk N'Lata, Baia Rock Boys, Black Maria.
 Venue: São Paulo Athletic Club

Rockgol 1999 
 Winner: Skank, Dread Lion, Baia Rock Boys
 Second: Barão Negro e o Reino Animal (Barão Vermelho, Cidade Negra, Dado e o Reino Animal)
 Venue: São Paulo Athletic Club

Rockgol 2000 
 Winner: Claudinho & Buchecha, Os Morenos
 Second: Skank, Dread Lion
 Venue: Estádio da Gávea

Rockgol 2001 
 Winner: M.S.T. (Cidade Negra, Só Pra Contrariar)
 Second: Skank, Dread Lion
 Venue: São Paulo Athletic Club

Rockgol 2002 
 Campeã: Comunidade Natidanja (Comunidade Nin-Jitsu, Natiruts, Daniel Carlomagno, Jairzinho)
 Second: Rockers F.C. (CPM 22, Vinny, Tihuana)
 Third: Ranca Toco F.C. (Sepultura, Falamansa, Simoninha, LS Jack)
 Fourth: Os Comédia (Supla, Charlie Brown Jr.)
 Venue: São Paulo Athletic Club

Rockgol 2003 
 Winner: Papas Fritas (Comunidade Nin-Jitsu, Natiruts, Kiko Zambianchi)
 Second: Gafanhotos (Pedro Luís e a Parede, Rappin' Hood, Simoninha, Otto, Ratos de Porão)
 Third: Arsênico (O Surto, Detonautas)
 Fourth: XV de Quatorze (Devotos, Tihuana, Raimundos)
 Venue: São Paulo Athletic Club

Rockgol 2004 
 Winner: Aranhas Negras (Br'oz, Shaaman, Felipe Dylon, Rappin' Hood)
 Second: Tamanduá (Orbitais, Dread Lion, Kiko Zambianchi, Sonic Júnior)
 Third: Cães Sarnentos (Nação Zumbi, CPM 22, LS Jack)
 Fourth: Amebas (Vinny, B5, Supla, Natiruts)
 Venue: São Paulo Athletic Club

Rockgol 2005 
 Winner: Resfriados (Br'oz, Helião, Korzus, Supla).
 Second: Diabéticos (Sepultura, Kiko Zambianchi, Dibob, Samambaia)
 Third: Catapora (Banda Catedral, Devotos, Pedro Luis e a Parede, Felipe Dylon).
 Fourth: Frieiras (Dead Fish, Rappin' Hood, CPM 22).
 Venue: São Paulo Athletic Club ("Monumental de Birigui")

Rockgol 2006 
 Winner: Luxemburgo (CPM 22, Forgotten Boys, Comunidade Nin-Jitsu, Relespública, Xis, Leandro Sapucahy, Marcelo D2)
 Second: Reino da Pirulândia (Supla, Massacration, Falamansa, Sonic Júnior)
 Third: Estados Unidos da Peperônia (Shaaman, Planta & Raiz, Johnny MC, Rappin' Hood, Gabriel, O Pensador, Ultraje a Rigor, Lucas Santtana)
 Fourth: República da Riváldia (Dead Fish, Ultramen, Ratos de Porão, Simoninha)
 Venue: São Paulo Athletic Club ("Venue Mané Pipoca")

Rockgol 2007 
 Winner: Horríver Prata (Forfun, Nação Zumbi, Maldita, Sapienza)
 Second: Milanesa (DMN, Acústicos e Valvulados, Banzé, Dibob, CPM 22)
 Third: Fenerbafo (Skank, Trêmula, Léo Maia, Andre Matos e Banda)
 Fourth: Once Pêssegos em Caldas (Fresno, Strike, Natiruts, Faces do Subúrbio)
 Venue:São Paulo Athletic Club ("Venue Mané Pipoca")

Rockgol 2008 
 Winner: Forfun Soccer Camp (Forfun, Zefirina Bomba, Rock Rocket, Leela, Forgotten Boys e Simoninha)
 Second:Sport Clube Supla Paulista (Supla, Mombojó, Matanza, Ludov)
 Third:Fresno De Pelotas F.C. (Fresno, Strike, Maldita, Marvin, Devotos, Faces do Subúrbio)
 Fourth:CPM 22 de Novembro de Piracicaba (CPM 22, Andre Matos e Banda, Catedral, Carbona)
 Venue: Conjunto Desportivo Constâncio Vaz GuimarãesReynaldo Gianecchini, (Reynaldão)

Rockgol 2011 
 Winner: Skank (Skank, Tihuana, Sabonetes, Emicida, Toni Platão)
 Second: Fresno (Fresno, Mombojó, Martin e Eduardo, Devotos do Ódio)
 Third: CPM 22 (CPM 22, Restart, Dibob, Comunidade Nin-Jitsu, Davi Moraes)
 Fourth: Nasi (Nasi, Detonautas Roque Clube, Scracho, Simoninha, Macaco Bong)
 Venue: Arena dos Prazeres (Pleasure Arena or Prazerzão) - Morro dos Prazeres (RJ)

Rockgol 2013 
 Winner: CPM 22 (CPM 22, Sabonetes, Rancore, Esteban).
 Second: Fresno (Fresno, ConeCrew Diretoria, Matanza, Comunidade Nin-Jitsu, Supla).
 Third: Forfun (Forfun, Vivendo do Ócio, Natiruts, Projota, Devotos do Ódio).
 Fourth: NX Zero (NX Zero, Mombojó, Tihuana, Gabriel o Pensador).
 Venue: Venue Jack Marin, (Parque da Aclimação, a park close to the centre of São Paulo)

References

External links 
Official site

Brazilian television series
Football in Brazil
MTV original programming